The Lesotho High Commissioner to Canada is the position for a representative from the Basotho government to the country of Canada.

 
Canada
Lesotho